Slovenia Open may refer to:
 Slovenia Open (tennis), a tennis tournament 
 Slovenia Open (figure skating), a figure skating competition